The following lists events that happened during 1881 in New Zealand.

Incumbents

Regal and viceregal
Head of State – Queen Victoria
Governor – The Hon. Sir Arthur Hamilton-Gordon

Government and law
The general election is held on 9 December. Afterwards the 8th New Zealand Parliament begins.

Speaker of the House – Maurice O'Rorke.
Premier – John Hall (New Zealand)
Minister of Finance – Harry Atkinson
Chief Justice – Hon Sir James Prendergast

Main centre leaders
Mayor of Auckland – James Clark
Mayor of Christchurch – Charles Thomas Ick followed by James Gapes
Mayor of Dunedin – Archibald Hilson Ross followed by James Gore
Mayor of Wellington – William Hutchison

Events 
 The government passes the Chinese Immigration Act 1881. This imposes a £10 tax per Chinese person entering New Zealand, and permits only one Chinese immigrant for every 10 tons of cargo.
 1 October – The first telephone exchange in New Zealand is opened in Christchurch.
 24 October – A telephone exchange is opened in Auckland.

Sport

Cricket
The Auckland Association is formed.
 An Australian team tours the country playing twelve matches against provincial teams. None of the games have first-class status, with the home teams fielding between 12 and 22 players. Australia suffered one loss, but 10 wickets to the Wanganui XXII. Itinerary

Horse racing
New Zealand Cup winner: Grip
New Zealand Derby winner: The Dauphin
Auckland Cup winner: King Quail
Wellington Cup winner: Natator

Rugby union
The Otago union is formed.

Provincial club rugby champions include: 
see also :Category:Rugby union in New Zealand

Shooting
Ballinger Belt: Lieutenant Paynter (Nelson)

Births
 16 January: Hercules Wright, rugby union player.
 14 February (in Australia): George Skellerup, industrialist
 6 April: Walter Broadfoot, politician.

Deaths
 15 September William Sefton Moorhouse, politician.

Unknown date
 Paora Te Potangaroa, Māori prophet.

See also
List of years in New Zealand
Timeline of New Zealand history
History of New Zealand
Military history of New Zealand
Timeline of the New Zealand environment
Timeline of New Zealand's links with Antarctica

References
General
 Romanos, J. (2001) New Zealand Sporting Records and Lists. Auckland: Hodder Moa Beckett. 
Specific

External links